Swithinbank may refer to:

People
 Anne Swithinbank (born 1957), horticulturist.
 Charles Swithinbank (1926–2014), British glaciologist.
 Harold William Swithinbank FRS FRSE FRGS FSA (1858-1928) British veterinarian and army and navy officer, father of Isobel Cripps

Geography
 Swithinbank Slope an ice slope in the Kirwan Escarpment.
 Swithinbank Range, part of the Churchill Mountains.
 Swithinbank Glacier, glacier on the Hemimont Plateau.
 Swithinbank Moraine, medial moraine in the Shackleton Glacier.